Heart Break Kodak is the seventh mixtape by American rapper Kodak Black. It was released on February 14, 2018, via Atlantic Records. The mixtape features guest appearances by Lil Wayne and Tory Lanez, meanwhile the production was handled by Murda Beatz, Helluva, Ben Billions, Dyryk, and C-Clipz Beatz, among others.

Background 
The mixtape was teased by Black on social media, he shared heart-themed images along with the hashtag "#HBK". The mixtape's release was announced a day before, on February 13, 2018. The mixtape was released while Black was in jail, serving a sentence he received for charges including "grand theft of a firearm, possession of marijuana, and two counts of probation violation".

Critical reception 

Pitchfork described the mixtape as "a war waged for Kodak's heart by the streets and unnamed lovers." HipHopDX called the mixtape an "808s & Heartbreak meets the trap (minus any of the game-changing elements)". The mixtape's theme is described by PopKiller as "drugs and wealth, revolves around amorities and angels and demons with this binding". AllMusic described the mixtape as an "R&B-influenced than his prior work, with the rapper singing more frequently than before".

Track listing
Credits adapted from BMI.

Charts

References 

Kodak Black albums
Atlantic Records albums
2018 mixtape albums
Contemporary R&B albums by American artists